Harmon Percival Marble (November 5, 1870 – February 3, 1945) was an American journalist and politician. He was the mayor of Las Vegas from 1938 to 1939 and was a photographer of Native Americans. He was a member of the Democratic Party.

Career

Indian Service 
As a young adult, he worked for a number of years in the newspaper business, founding his own paper, the Humboldt Leader (probably Humboldt, Nebraska), in 1897. In 1911, he sold the paper in order to join the Indian Service. He was first assigned to the Navajo Reservation in Arizona, then in 1913 to the Menominee Indian Reservation in Wisconsin, followed by work with the Sioux tribes at Fort Thompson, South Dakota. Later, he was in charge of the Southern Pueblos in Albuquerque, New Mexico, and finally returned to Arizona.

Las Vegas 
In 1926, he retired from the Indian Service and moved to Long Beach, California, where he owned a cigar store. Later, he joined family in Las Vegas, Nevada and lived out his remaining years there. He was a prominent civic leader and mayor of Las Vegas, and was instrumental in establishing the first low-income family housing development in the city, which was renamed "Marble Manor" in his honor after his death in 1945.

Photography

Marble is known as a prolific photographer of Native Americans. During his government career, he took advantage of opportunities afforded by his positions to take hundreds of photographs of the Navajo, Menominee and Sioux tribes. His photographs were inconsistently exposed, often poorly composed and poorly printed. However, this lack of artistic sense rendered photos which offer an unvarnished portraiture of the indigenous population more so than better known images captured by contemporaries the likes of Edward Curtis and Rodman Wanamaker.

References

External links
 
 Images of Harmon Percy Marble photographs
 Harmon Percy Marble video essay
 Navajo man and woman, Warren Trading Post Co., Kayenta, Arizona Albumen photograph, Harmon Percy Marble, 1926

1870 births
1945 deaths
American photographers
Journalists from Las Vegas
Journalists from Nebraska
Mayors of Las Vegas
Nevada Democrats
People from Pawnee County, Nebraska
United States Indian agents